Finna is a 2020 LGBT fantasy novella by Nino Cipri. It has been praised for its inclusion of queer characters and its criticism of capitalism and retail work. It was nominated for the 2021 Hugo Award for Best Novella, the 2021 Locus Award for Best Novella, and the 2021 Nebula Award for Best Novella. It was followed by a sequel, Defekt, in 2021.

Plot

Ava works at LitenVärld, a big box retail store, with her ex Jules. One day at work, a wormhole opens in the store. A customer's grandmother, Ursula Nouri, wanders inside. Ava and Jules are sent to fetch her using a tracking device called a FINNA. They travel through numerous parallel universes. In one, they find that Mrs. Nouri has been killed by parasitic plants; the FINNA directs them to a “suitable replacement”. They meet Captain Nouresh, an alternate-universe version of Mrs. Nouri. As they fight off dangerous drones, Ava escorts Nouresh back to her world; Jules stays behind. Ava quits her job and takes the FINNA in search of Jules.

Major themes

The novella criticizes the absurdities of capitalism and big box retail work. Ava and Jules are sent on a dangerous quest and offered gift cards in return. This is comparable to real-life examples in which minimum wage retail workers are mistreated by managers asking for the impossible.

Reviewer Lee Mandelo wrote that Finna's protagonists are unique in that their romantic relationship has already ended. In contrast to a common story arc in which acquaintances develop a romantic relationship, Ava's and Jules's relationship is moving from romance into friendship. The reviewer notes that this is a common experience for queer people, whose dating groups and friend groups are likely to be closely intertwined. In addition to the relationship between Jules and Ava, the novella's queer themes are explored in its discussions of labor and politics.

Reception

Finna received positive critical reviews. It was nominated for the 2021 Locus Award for Best Novella, the 2021 Hugo Award for Best Novella, and the 2021 Nebula Award for Best Novella. It was additionally nominated for the 2021 Lambda Literary Award for Transgender Fiction.

Writing for NPR, author Amal El-Mohtar praised the author for accurately portraying queer identities, anxiety, and depression. A review for Autostraddle criticized the work's excessive use of snark and felt that it detracted from its criticism of capitalism. Despite this, the same reviewer found that Cipri's "overarching points about capitalism’s dehumanizing effects are well-taken" and found the novella "an engaging and lively read".

References

2020 American novels
LGBT speculative fiction novels
Novels with transgender themes
2020s LGBT novels
English-language novels
Tor Books books
2020 science fiction novels